100% Hits: The Best of 2001 + Summer Hits is a 2001 compilation album released by EMI Music Australia and Warner Music Australia.  The album was the #13 compilation album on the 2002 year-end charts in Australia. The album was certified platinum in Australia.

Track listing

Disc 1
Robbie Williams and Kylie Minogue – "Kids" (4:46)
NSYNC – "Pop" (4:00)
Da Muttz – "Wassuup!" (3:37)
Scandal'us – "Me, Myself & I" (3:09)
Janet Jackson – "All for You" (4:25)
Daft Punk – "One More Time" (5:24)
Uncle Kracker – "Follow Me" (3:37)
Madison Avenue – "Reminiscing" (3:32)
Sugar Ray – "When It's Over" (3:38)
Emma Bunton – "What Took You So Long?" (4:01)
Kylie Minogue – "Your Disco Needs You" (3:35)
Geri Halliwell – "It's Raining Men" (4:17)
Sugababes – "Overload" (4:39)
Atomic Kitten – "Whole Again" (3:06)
Joe featuring Mystikal – "Stutter" (3:35)
Liberty City – "I Met Her In Miami" (3:58)
R.E.M. – "Imitation of Life" (3:57)
The Superjesus – "Gravity" (4:01)
Lash – "Take Me Away" (3:36)

Disc 2
The Ones – "Flawless" (3:10)
Tall Paul vs. INXS – "Precious Heart" (3:36)
Blue – "Too Close" (3:48)
Paul Mac featuring Peta Morris – "Just the Thing" (3:55)
Bardot – "I Need Somebody" (3:29)
Sam La More – "Takin' Hold" (3:28)
Planet Funk – "Chase the Sun" (3:44)
Jive Jones – "Me, Myself & I" (3:30)
Gorillaz – "19-2000" (3:29)
Dante Thomas featuring Pras – "Miss California" (3:28)
Alex Lloyd – "Amazing" (3:24)
Robbie Williams – "Better Man" (3:22)
Victoria Beckham – "Not Such an Innocent Girl" (3:20)
Anuj – "What You Wanna Do" (2:52)
Fragma – "Toca's Miracle" (3:52)
Nivea – "Don't Mess with the Radio" (3:56)
Aaliyah – "Try Again" (4:45)
DJ Pied Piper and the Masters of Ceremonies – "Do You Really Like It?" (3:24)
Gwyneth Paltrow – "Bette Davis Eyes" (3:29)
Spice Girls – "Holler" (4:15)
The Corrs – "Give Me a Reason" (3:12)

References

External links
 100% Hits: Best Of 2001 + Summer Hits

2001 compilation albums
EMI Records compilation albums
2001 in Australian music